Coffee County Courthouse may refer to:

Coffee County Courthouse (Elba, Alabama)
Coffee County Courthouse (Enterprise, Alabama)
Coffee County Courthouse (Tennessee), Manchester, Tennessee